The tilt test is a type of safety test that certain government vehicle certification bodies require new vehicle designs to pass before being allowed on the road or rail track.

The test is an assessment of the weight distribution and hence the position of the centre of gravity of the vehicle, and can be carried out in a laden or unladen state, i.e. with or without passengers or freight. The test can be applied to automobiles, trucks, buses and rail vehicles.

The test involves tilting the vehicle in the notional direction of the side of the vehicle, on a movable platform. In order to pass the test, the vehicle must not tip over before a specified angle of tilt is reached by the table.

In the United Kingdom, double-decker buses have to: "be capable of leaning, fully laden on top, at an angle of 28 deg without toppling over before they are allowed on the road."

The same 28-degree requirement is in place in Hong Kong for double-decker buses. For single-deckers the requirement is 35 degrees.

See also
 Vehicle metrics
 Weight distribution
 Moose test

References

Product safety
Vehicle design